Nazif is an Arabic masculine given name, meaning "pure", "clean", "innocent", "neat and clean" and "chaste". It may refer to:

Given name
 Nazif Kayacık, Turkish Army general
 Nazif Memedi, Croatian politician
 Nazif Shahrani, Afghan academic
 Nazif ibn Yumn, Melkite Christian mathematician
Serdar Nazif Nasır, Turkish plastic surgeon

Surname
 Ahmed Nazif, Egyptian politician
 Süleyman Nazif, Turkish poet

Arabic-language surnames
Arabic masculine given names
Turkish-language surnames
Turkish masculine given names

de:Nazif